Heřmanov is a municipality and village in Děčín District in the Ústí nad Labem Region of the Czech Republic. It has about 500 inhabitants.

Administrative parts
Villages of Blankartice and Fojtovice are administrative parts of Heřmanov.

References

Villages in Děčín District